Western Heights  is a suburb of Rotorua in the Bay of Plenty Region of New Zealand's North Island.

Demographics

Western Heights had a population of 4,404 at the 2018 New Zealand census, an increase of 582 people (15.2%) since the 2013 census, and an increase of 312 people (7.6%) since the 2006 census. There were 1,365 households, comprising 2,151 males and 2,256 females, giving a sex ratio of 0.95 males per female, with 1,263 people (28.7%) aged under 15 years, 1,005 (22.8%) aged 15 to 29, 1,725 (39.2%) aged 30 to 64, and 408 (9.3%) aged 65 or older.

Ethnicities were 48.9% European/Pākehā, 62.7% Māori, 10.0% Pacific peoples, 4.2% Asian, and 1.2% other ethnicities. People may identify with more than one ethnicity.

The percentage of people born overseas was 9.5, compared with 27.1% nationally.

Although some people chose not to answer the census's question about religious affiliation, 52.1% had no religion, 31.5% were Christian, 6.2% had Māori religious beliefs, 0.5% were Hindu, 0.1% were Muslim, 0.3% were Buddhist and 2.1% had other religions.

Of those at least 15 years old, 258 (8.2%) people had a bachelor's or higher degree, and 768 (24.5%) people had no formal qualifications. 165 people (5.3%) earned over $70,000 compared to 17.2% nationally. The employment status of those at least 15 was that 1,317 (41.9%) people were employed full-time, 459 (14.6%) were part-time, and 345 (11.0%) were unemployed.

Education

References

Suburbs of Rotorua
Populated places in the Bay of Plenty Region